Sunwapta Pass (2,035 m/6,677 ft) (2,023 m/6,637 ft) (2,055 m/6,742 ft) is a mountain pass in the Canadian Rockies in the province of Alberta. Sunwapta Pass is the low point of the saddle created between Mount Athabasca and Nigel Peak.  The pass marks the boundary between Banff and Jasper National Parks.  The Icefields Parkway travels through Sunwapta Pass 108 km (67 mi) southeast of the town of Jasper and 122 km (76 mi) northwest of the Parkway's junction with the Trans-Canada Highway near Lake Louise.  The pass is the second highest point on the Icefields Parkway. Bow Summit (2,069 m/6,790 ft) in Banff National Park is the highest point on the parkway.

Sunwapta Pass marks the watershed divide between the Athabasca River drainage to the north and the North Saskatchewan system to the south.  Waters flowing north from this summit eventually reach the Arctic Ocean via the Mackenzie River, while those flowing south cross the prairies via the Saskatchewan and Nelson Rivers to Hudson Bay and the Atlantic Ocean.

References

Banff National Park
Jasper National Park
Mountain passes of Alberta